Nikitsch is a town in the district of Oberpullendorf in the Austrian state of Burgenland in Austria. About 87% of the town's inhabitants are Burgenland Croats, the highest percentage of any town in Burgenland.  In 1971, the towns of Kroatisch Geresdorf (Gerištof, Gyirót), Kroatisch Minihof (Mjenovo, Malomháza), and Nikitsch were merged to form the present town.

Population

References

Cities and towns in Oberpullendorf District